The Piano Sonata No. 15 in C major, Hob. XVI/15, is an arrangement for solo keyboard of the 1st, 3rd and 4th movements of the Divertimento in C (Hob. II/11) by Joseph Haydn. This sonata is now considered spurious.

Notes

References 

Jones, David Wyn. Oxford Composer Companions: Haydn. Oxford: Oxford University Press, 2002.
Landon, H.C. Robbins. Haydn: Chronicle and Works. Vol 1. The Early Years 1732-1765. London: Thames & Hudson, 1980.

External links 

Piano sonatas by Joseph Haydn
Compositions in C major